Cyrus is the self-titled debut studio album by Cyrus, the winner of the seventh season of The X Factor Australia, released through Sony Music Australia on 9 December 2015. The album peaked at number nine on the ARIA Albums Chart and was certified Gold by the Australian Recording Industry Association for shipments of 35,000 copies. It was preceded by the lead single "Stone", which debuted at number four on the ARIA Singles Chart.
The album features re-recorded studio tracks of some of the songs he performed on the show including his winning single, "Stone".

Review
Jessica Thomas of Renowned for Sound said, "Cyrus sees Cyrus take his brand of smooth pop covering a plethora of popular tracks and breathing a fresh life into them. There are 11 songs on his debut and while the 10 cover performances boast a very similar aesthetic to the original tune they're all infused with that Cyrus twist which makes them stand well on their own."

Track listing

Charts

Weekly charts

Year-end charts

Certifications

Release history

References

2015 albums
Sony Music Australia albums